Alick Leonard Maemae (born 10 December 1985) is a football midfielder from the Solomon Islands.

He hails from Suraina, North East coast of Malaita.

Club career
He played soccer at a very early age. His interest in soccer forced him to abandon secondary education back at his home village at Manasu'u. Inspired by the first Solomon Islands professional soccer player, Batram Suri who is his very close relative, Maemae went to Honiara and started playing for Koloale FC. At Honiara, he started to gain popularity.

The pacy and skilful, leftsided Maemae has played for NZFC outfit YoungHeart Manawatu, where he was joined by his compatriot Nelson Sale Kilifa. Other former clubs include Richmond Athletic, Koloale FC Honiara and Fawkner-Whittlesea Blues in Australia's Victorian Premier League.

In May 2010, he won the Oceania Champions League with Hekari United. In September that year he followed his teammate and compatriot Stanley Waita to Amical FC.

International career
He made his debut for the Solomon Islands national football team in 2004 against Vanuatu and collected 19 caps, scoring 5 goals.

Honours
Oceania Champions League: 1
 2009–10

References

External links
 
 2008/2009 season stats - NZFC

1985 births
Living people
People from Malaita Province
Solomon Islands footballers
Solomon Islands international footballers
YoungHeart Manawatu players
2004 OFC Nations Cup players
Expatriate association footballers in New Zealand
Expatriate footballers in Papua New Guinea
Expatriate footballers in Vanuatu
Solomon Islands expatriate sportspeople in New Zealand
Solomon Islands expatriate footballers
Solomon Islands expatriate sportspeople in Papua New Guinea
Solomon Islands expatriate sportspeople in Vanuatu
Association football midfielders